Admiral Sir David Murray Anderson,  (11 April 1874 – 30 October 1936) was a British naval officer and governor. Anderson served in the Royal Navy from the age of 13 and served in many colonial wars and was given various Empire postings, rising to the rank of admiral in 1931. He retired a year later and took up the posting as Governor of Newfoundland, where he also took up the role of Chairman of the Government following the suspension of self-government in the Dominion of Newfoundland. Leaving Newfoundland in 1935, he was appointed as Governor of New South Wales but served only briefly due to his ill health. He died while in office aged 62.

Early life and career
Anderson was born on 11 April 1874, the second son of General David Anderson, Colonel of the Cheshire Regiment, and his wife Charlotte Christina, née Anderson in Newton-by-Chester in Cheshire, England. His elder brother was Lieutenant General Sir Warren Hastings Anderson. In 1887, as a 13-year-old, he became a naval cadet in the training ship Britannia at Dartmouth. Seeing action against King Koko slave traders on the Niger River, he became a lieutenant on 23 February 1895 at age 20. Anderson saw further action against West-African rebels and in the Ashanti Campaign. In May 1902, he was posted as first and gunnery lieutenant to the cruiser  on the Channel Squadron.

In 1905 he was promoted to commander and was posted to the Royal Yacht HMY Victoria and Albert in 1908. That year, he married a New Zealander, Edith Teschemaker. On 29 July 1910 Anderson was appointed a Member of the Fourth Class of the Royal Victorian Order.

For his actions leading to the capture of Dar es Salaam he was appointed a Commander of the Order of St Michael and St George on 1 January 1918. He was also invested by the Sultan of Zanzibar with the Order of the Brilliant Star of Zanzibar, Second Class. From 1918 to 1919 Anderson was posted to command the battleship  in the Grand Fleet. In May 1921 he was appointed as an aide-de-camp (ADC) to King George V, which he held until April 1922. After a posting in England, he was promoted to rear admiral in 1922. On 2 June 1923 he was invested as a Companion of the Order of the Bath. He was later posted from August 1923 to October 1925 as the Senior Naval Officer, Yangtze, and briefly served as temporary Commander-in-Chief China Station in 1925. While in China, he was called upon on three separate occasions to command a multi-national force of Japanese, British, American, Portuguese and Italian sailors to help protect the Shanghai International Settlement. For his efforts in China, he was awarded the Order of the Rising Sun, Third Class, by Emperor Hirohito of Japan.

Further promoted to vice admiral in 1927, he was appointed to command the Africa Station. From June to September 1928 he served as High Commissioner to the Union of South Africa. Being fluent in French, he was further appointed to Geneva as the Admiralty representative to the League of Nations permanent advisory commission from 1929 to 1931. On 3 June 1930 he was appointed as a Knight Commander of the Order of the Bath, and was promoted to admiral in 1931. He retired at his own request on 5 July 1932.

Governor of Newfoundland

Anderson was then appointed on 20 October 1932 as the Governor of Newfoundland. He became His Majesty's Representative at a time of great instability in the Dominion of Newfoundland. Newfoundland had been hit badly by the Great Depression, leaving most of the banks on the verge of insolvency, saved only by emergency loans from Britain, the state Treasury was empty and the political process was discredited by corruption and incompetence.

The Government, led by Prime Minister Frederick C. Alderdice, called upon the British government to take direct control until Newfoundland could become self-sustaining. The United Kingdom, concerned over Newfoundland's likelihood of defaulting on its loans, asked the government to establish the Newfoundland Royal Commission, headed by a Scottish peer, Lord Amulree. Its report, released in 1933, assessed Newfoundland's political system as institutionally corrupt and its economic future as bleak, recommending the abolition of responsible government, and its replacement by a Commission of the British Government. Acting on the report's recommendations, Alderdice's government voted itself out of existence in December 1933. Appointed as chair of the Commission of Government in 1934, Anderson found his role as Governor with significantly expanded powers and proved himself up to the job, constantly sending reports back to the Dominions Office and giving advice to the Dominions Secretary on how to deal with the Commission members.

Despite his new-found powers, Anderson took the position of neutral mediator, intervening only when there was a dispute in the commission. He was nevertheless involved with restructuring the administration of the state, including government departments, social services, the health system and the postal system. His approach proved to be not enough to bring the Commission out of petty arguments and disputes and in October 1935 it was announced that he would be replaced by another Naval officer, Sir Humphrey Walwyn. Anderson and his wife departed from Newfoundland the following January.

Governor of New South Wales

In November 1935 it was announced that he was to become the Governor of New South Wales, a relatively quieter post. He was invested by King Edward VIII as a Knight Commander of the Order of St Michael and St George on 5 May 1936, and as a Knight of Grace of the Venerable Order of St John of Jerusalem on 23 June 1936.

En route to Australia he was taken ill, and had to spend six weeks in hospital in Perth, Western Australia. He was sworn in at Sydney on 6 August 1936. Because of his recurring illness, Lady Anderson undertook many official duties on his behalf, while the Lieutenant Governor of New South Wales, Sir Philip Street, carried out his legislative and ceremonial duties. On 29 October he collapsed and died of a cerebral haemorrhage early in the morning the next day at Government House. His body was laid in state in St. Andrew's Cathedral, Sydney and was shipped back to England for burial.

Lady Edith Muriel Anderson was appointed Dame Commander of the Order of the British Empire (DBE) on 11 May 1937 for public service in New South Wales.

Honours

References

Further reading

|-

|-

1874 births
1936 deaths
People from Malpas, Cheshire
Royal Navy admirals
Members of the Royal Victorian Order
Knights Commander of the Order of the Bath
Knights Commander of the Order of St Michael and St George
Recipients of the Order of the Rising Sun
Recipients of the Order of St. Anna
Governors of the Dominion of Newfoundland
Governors of New South Wales
Ambassadors and High Commissioners of the United Kingdom to South Africa
Knights of the Order of the Dannebrog
Military personnel from Cheshire
Members of the Newfoundland Commission of Government